St. Mary's Academy (SMA) is a Catholic, independent day school in the Loretto tradition located in Cherry Hills Village, Colorado.  Founded by the Sisters of Loretto in 1864, St. Mary's Academy educates boys and girls.  St. Mary's Academy is composed of a co-ed Lower School (co-ed pre-kindergarten through grade 5) and Middle School (co-ed grades 6-8), and continues its long tradition as a college preparatory high school for girls (grades 9-12).  Three times the U.S. Department of Education has honored St. Mary's Academy as a School of Excellence (a program initially titled Blue Ribbon Schools).  St. Mary's Academy High School offers 16 AP courses.

History

St. Mary's Academy is one of Denver's pioneer institutions.  It is the oldest continuously operating pre-collegiate school in Denver and has the distinction of awarding the first high school diploma in 1875, a year before Colorado became a state.  Originally situated at 14th and California Streets on the edge of the prairie, in 1911 the school moved and built next door to Margaret “Molly” Brown on Pennsylvania Avenue.  Needing additional space and recognizing that families were moving to the suburbs, St. Mary's Academy located to its current home in the early 1950s.  Begun as a school for girls, boys were welcomed into all Lower and Middle School grades in the mid-1970s.

Activities

Numerous Destination Imagination teams form every year in Lower School.  In 2014 an all-boy team finished in first place in the Scientific Category at the Global Finals.
Middle School students travel to a buffalo ranch in Northern Colorado, Keystone Science Center, the East Coast, and Cochiti Pueblo in New Mexico for service.
In its first year, the high school robotics team won awards in the 2013-2014 Denver and regional BEST Robotics Competition. They were the only all-girls team in that competition and are one of a handful of all-girl teams participating in the international FIRST Robotics Competition in 2014-2015.
St. Mary's Academy offers opportunities to further engage with the Loretto Community: service work at Loretto Motherhouse in Kentucky, a trip to the United Nations and advocacy training at the El Paso/Juarez border.

Athletics

Affiliations
Association of Colorado Independent Schools (ACIS)

National Association of Independent Schools (NAIS)

National Catholic Education Association

National Coalition of Girls’ Schools

Colorado High School Activities Association

3A Metropolitan League

Notable alumnae

 Condoleezza Rice, U.S. Secretary of State, 2005-2009
 Jane Lubchenco, Administrator of the NOAA (National Oceanic and Atmospheric Administration), 2009-2013
Donna J. Haraway, Professor Emerita in the  History of Consciousness at the University of California, Santa Cruz; scholar in the field of science and technology studies; and influential feminist philosopher.

Notes and references
"St Mary’s Academy: 150 Years of Courage, Tenacity and Vision" (September–October 2014 issue of Colorado Heritage, the magazine of History Colorado).

External links
 

Schools in Arapahoe County, Colorado
Catholic secondary schools in Colorado
Educational institutions established in 1864
1864 establishments in Colorado Territory